Claude Edison Thomas (15 April 1891 – 5 July 1918) was an Australian rules footballer who played with South Melbourne in the Victorian Football League. He was killed in action during World War I.

Family
One of the ten children of William Edward Paul Thomas (1851-1918), and Louisa Thomas (1855-1925), née Williams, Claude Edison Thomas was born at Gisborne, Victoria on 15 April 1891.

Education
He was educated at All Saints' Grammar School, in East St Kilda.

Football
Recruited from prominent junior club Port Melbourne Railway United, Thomas played on the wing.

He played in thirteen home-and-away games (i.e., no Finals) over two seasons — the first, replacing George Bower, was against Fitzroy, at the Brunswick Street Oval, on 9 May 1914 — coming in and out of the South Melbourne team on multiple occasions during the two seasons. His football career ended when he enlisted in the First AIF.

Military service
Employed as a fireman with the Victorian Railways, he enlisted in the First AIF on 24 August 1915 and departed from Melbourne aboard HMAT Kabinga (A58) on 8 May 1916. Although given the rank of Driver, he reverted to the rank of Private in May 1918 at his own request in order to serve in the same battalion as his older brother.

Two of his brothers also served in the First AIF: Rupert Clarence Thomas (1893-1918), and Vere Stanley Thomas (1895-1975). Serving in the same unit as Claude, Rupert Clarence Thomas was killed in action, in France. on 8 August 1918, five weeks after Claude's death.

Death
On 5 July 1918, Thomas was lying in a trench near Vaire Wood, during the Battle of Hamel when a piece of shrapnel from a German shell glanced off the parapet and struck his ammunition pouch, "the contents of which exploded and blew a hole right through him, killing him instantly".

He was eventually buried at the Villers-Bretonneux Military Cemetery.

See also
 List of Victorian Football League players who died in active service

Footnotes

References
 Holmesby, Russell & Main, Jim (2007). The Encyclopedia of AFL Footballers. 7th ed. Melbourne: Bas Publishing.
 Main, J. & Allen, D., "Thomas, Claude", pp. 184–185 in Main, J. & Allen, D., Fallen – The Ultimate Heroes: Footballers Who Never Returned From War, Crown Content, (Melbourne), 2002. 
 First World War Embarkation Roll: Driver Claude Eddison (sic) Thomas (12626), collection of the Australian War Memorial.
 First World War Nominal Roll: Driver Claude Edison Thomas (12626), collection of the Australian War Memorial.
 First World War Service Record: Private Claude Edison Thomas (12626), National Archives of Australia.
 Roll of Honour Circular: Private Claude Edison Thomas (12626), Australian War Memorial.
 Roll of Honour: Private Claude Edison Thomas (12626), Australian War Memorial.
 Victorian Casualties: List No.420: Killed in Action: "THOMAS, C. E., St. Kilda, 5/7/18", The Argus, (Saturday, 3 August 1918), p.17.

External links
 
 

1891 births
1918 deaths
Australian rules footballers from Victoria (Australia)
Sydney Swans players
Australian military personnel killed in World War I
People from Gisborne, Victoria